Wigan is a town in the Metropolitan Borough of Wigan, Greater Manchester, England.  The town, together with the outlying townships of Pemberton, Scholes, Whelley, Worsley Mesnes, Winstanley, and Goose Green, (the former Wigan County Borough),  contains 286 listed buildings that are recorded in the National Heritage List for England.  Of these, nine are listed at Grade II*, the middle of the three grades, and the others are at Grade II, the lowest grade.

Wigan is an ancient settlement that developed into a market town, but its main growth came with the arrival of the Industrial Revolution when its surrounding areas became the main centres of mining in the South Lancashire Coalfield.  Its main industries, in addition to coal mining, were textiles and ironworks.  The Leeds and Liverpool Canal passes through the town, having been built between 1774 and 1816, and this improved transport before the railways arrived.  These factors resulted in the development not only of mills and factories, but housing and the construction of shops, churches, leisure facilities including public houses, and municipal, civic and commercial buildings.  This history is reflected in the listed buildings.



Key

Buildings

Notes and references

Notes

Citations

Sources

Wigan
Buildings and structures in Wigan